Kirst is a surname:
 Alex Kirst, drummer in The Nymphs, an alternative rock band of the late 1980s
  (born 1951), German athletics competitor
 Hans Hellmut Kirst (1914–1989), German novelist and the author of 46 books
 Joachim Kirst (born 1947), retired East German decathlete
 Jutta Kirst (born 1954), retired female track and field athlete who competed for East Germany
 Michael W. Kirst (born 1939), professor
 Rita Kirst (born 1950), German high jumper
 Roger Kirst, Henry M. Grether Professor of Law at the University of Nebraska–Lincoln College of Law
 Whitey Kirst, American-Canadian rock guitarist, singer, and songwriter

See also
 Kaarst
 Karste
 Kirsteen
 Kirsten
 Kirsti
 Kirstin
 Kirsty
 Kursztyn